Sainte-Hélène is a commune in the Lozère department in southern France.

Demography

See also
Communes of the Lozère department

References

Saintehelene